Mumbai Tennis Masters is a tennis team representing the city of Mumbai in Champions Tennis League.

The players representing this team are Sergi Bruguera, Tommy Robredo, Alize Cornet, Sriram Balaji, Pranjala Yadlapalli and Mohit Mayur Jayaprakash.

References

Tennis teams in India
Sports teams in Maharashtra
Sport in Mumbai
2014 establishments in Maharashtra
Sports clubs established in 2014